Elections to Cheshire East Council took place on Thursday 2 May 2019 in all 52 wards, with each ward returning between one and three councillors to the council. The Conservative Party lost overall control of the council, losing 17 seats; the Labour Party gained 9 seats, independents gained 6 and the Liberal Democrats gained 2.

The elections were held against a background of a number of controversies, with the council facing eight criminal investigations. Multiple Conservative Cabinet members lost their seats, with Ainsley Arnold (Planning) losing out to Independents in Macclesfield Tytherington and Paul Bates (Finance) falling to fifth place in Congleton East, whilst then-Leader of the Council Rachel Bailey came within 78 votes of losing her seat to the Liberal Democrats. The biggest shocks came in Broken Cross and Upton, with Labour's Rob Vernon and James Barber becoming the first ever Labour councillors for the area and unseating the Mayor-elect, Liz Durham, and Sandbach Ettiley Heath and Wheelock, where Laura Crane achieved a huge swing to win the seat for Labour against Conservative councillor Gail Wait.

No party or grouping held a majority of the council seats, and so after a few weeks of negotiation, Labour and the Independents agreed to form a joint-Cabinet that would run the council for the following year, with a focus on changing the system of governance to abolish the Cabinet and replace it with the old committee system.

Summary

Election result

|-

Results by Ward

Alderley Edge

Alsager

Audlem

Bollington

Brereton Rural

Broken Cross and Upton

Bunbury

Chelford

Congleton East

Congleton West

Crewe Central

Crewe East

Crewe North

Crewe South

Crewe St. Barnabas

Crewe West

Dane Valley

Disley

Gawsworth

Handforth

Haslington

High Legh

Knutsford

Leighton

Macclesfield Central

Macclesfield East

Macclesfield Hurdsfield

Macclesfield South

Macclesfield Tytherington

Macclesfield West and Ivy

Middlewich

Mobberley
This ward's single seat was uncontested.

Nantwich North and West

Nantwich South and Stapeley

Odd Rode

Poynton East and Pott Shrigley

Poynton West and Adlington

Prestbury

Sandbach Elworth

Sandbach Ettiley Heath and Wheelock

Sandbach Heath and East

Sandbach Town

Shavington

Sutton

Willaston and Rope

Wilmslow Dean Row

Wilmslow East

Wilmslow Lacey Green

Wilmslow West and Chorley

Wistaston

Wrenbury

Wybunbury

Notes
 Italics denote a sitting councillor for the same ward.
 1. Elected as a Conservative councillor for the same ward in 2015.

References

2019 English local elections
Cheshire East Council elections
2010s in Cheshire
May 2019 events in the United Kingdom